Hesperonemastoma modestum is a species of harvestman in the family Taracidae. It is found in North America.

References

Harvestmen
Articles created by Qbugbot
Animals described in 1894